Limnaecia mercuriella is a moth in the family Cosmopterigidae. It is found on Borneo.

References

Natural History Museum Lepidoptera generic names catalog

Limnaecia
Moths described in 1864
Moths of Borneo
Taxa named by Francis Walker (entomologist)